Rožmberk is a fish pond in the South Bohemian Region of the Czech Republic, next to the town Třeboň. It is part of the Třeboň fishpond system, and is the largest fish pond in the world.

Geography and parametres

Water from the river Lužnice flows into the pond.

History
The pond was designed and built under guidance of Jakub Krčín, working for the Bohemian aristocratic family of the Rosenberg family and it is named after that family. At the time of its creation, its main task was to regulate the frequent floods caused by the Lužnice. The work started in 1584 and was finished in 1590.

At this time many fish ponds were established throughout South Bohemia, and there are several other large ponds in the vicinity  of Rožmberk Pond, including Velký Tisý, Svět, and Opatovický.

See also
List of ponds of the Czech Republic

References

External links

Bohemia - A Year in the Wetlands - The Secrets of Nature Documentary

Artificial lakes of the Czech Republic
Geography of the South Bohemian Region
Jindřichův Hradec District
Fish ponds
RRozmberk